Marianne Verdonk (born 31 August 1986) is a retired Dutch Paralympic athlete who competed in mainly sprinting events in international level events.

She retired after not being selected to participate in the 2016 Paralympic Games.

References

1986 births
Living people
People from Geldrop
Sportspeople from North Brabant
Paralympic athletes of the Netherlands
Dutch female sprinters
Dutch female hurdlers
Dutch pentathletes
Dutch heptathletes
21st-century Dutch women